The Organisation for Joint Armament Cooperation (French: Organisation Conjointe de Coopération en matière d'ARmement; OCCAR) is a European intergovernmental organisation that facilitates and manages collaborative armament programmes through their lifecycle between the governments of Belgium, France, Germany, Italy, Spain, and the United Kingdom.

History

OCCAR was established on 12 November 1996 by the Defence Ministers of France, Germany, Italy and the United Kingdom. Legal status was not achieved, however, until January 2001 when the parliaments of the four founding states ratified the OCCAR Convention. Other European nations may join OCCAR, subject to their actual involvement in a substantive collaborative equipment programme involving at least one OCCAR partner and ratification of the OCCAR Convention. Belgium and Spain joined the organisation in respectively 2003 and 2005.

Other states can participate to OCCAR programmes without becoming a member state. Currently the European Union member states and/or NATO members Turkey, Netherlands, Luxembourg, Finland, Sweden, Lithuania and Poland participate in one or more OCCAR programmes without being formal members.

Structure
The highest decision-making body within OCCAR as corporate organisation is the Board of Supervisors (BoS). Each OCCAR programmes is supervised by a Programme Board (strategic decisions) and a Programme Committee (operational decisions). The programmes are executed by the OCCAR Executive Administration (OCCAR-EA) in accordance with the decisions of the supervisory bodies. OCCAR-EA is headed by the OCCAR Director (Matteo Bisceglia since September 2019) and consists of a Central Office and the Programme Divisions. OCCAR-EA employs over 300 staff members.

Current programmes
The 16 programmes currently managed by OCCAR are the following:

Aircraft 
 Airbus A400M Atlas turboprop military transport aircraft
 Eurocopter Tiger attack helicopter
 Eurodrone or European Medium Altitude Long Endurance Remotely Piloted Aircraft System (MALE RPAS)
 Multinational Multi-Role Tanker Transport Fleet (MMF)

Intelligence and communications 

European Secure Software-defined Radio (ESSOR)

 COBRA counter-battery radar system
 Multinational Space-based Imaging System (MUSIS)
 Night Vision Capability - 2021 acquisition of 9,550 units for Belgium and Germany, from a consortium of Hensoldt and Theon Sensors

Land vehicles 

 Boxer multirole armoured vehicle

Missiles 

 FSAF & PAAMS surface-to-air anti-missile systems
 Future Tactical Air-to-Surface Missile (Missile Air-Sol Tactique Futur, MAST-F) - under development for French Tiger III by MBDA

Ships 
 FREMM Multimission frigates
 Logistic Support Ships - Vulcano-class logistic support ships for Italy and Bâtiment ravitailleur de forces for France
 Maritime Mine Counter Measures (MCMM)
 Thaon di Revel-class offshore patrol vessel (Pattugliatore Polivalente d'Altura, PPA)
 U212 Near Future Submarine

See also 

 Common Security and Defence Policy
 Permanent Structured Cooperation
 European Defence Agency

References

External links 
 
 OCCAR Convention

International military organizations
International organizations based in Europe
Bodies of the Common Security and Defence Policy